Stiretrus decastigmus is a species of insect found in South America, including the countries of Argentina, Bolivia, Brazil, and Paraguay. It is a predator of the insect pests from the genus Microtheca, including Microtheca ochroloma, and has been reared in laboratories for possible use in biological pest control.

References

Asopinae
Biological pest control insects
Insects described in 1838
Hemiptera of South America